Xanbulaq is a village in the municipality of Yeni Abdinli in the Yardymli Rayon of Azerbaijan.

References

Populated places in Yardimli District